Hong Lake is a  freshwater lake in the municipal region of Jingzhou, in central China's Hubei province.

Its name originates from: Hong vast, immense; flood, deluge + Hu lake, and is used as the name for the nearby county-level city of Honghu.

It is known for its lotus flowers.

See also
Red Guards on Honghu Lake
Red Guards on Honghu Lake (film)

References 

Lakes of Hubei
Honghu